All the Women Are White, All the Blacks Are Men, But Some of Us Are Brave (1982) is a landmark feminist anthology in Black Women's Studies printed in numerous editions, co-edited by Akasha Gloria Hull, Patricia Bell-Scott, and Barbara Smith.

Awards
Hull received the National Institute's Women of Color Award for her contribution to this book. Her contribution to this "landmark scholarship directed attention to the lives of Black women and, combined with the numerous articles she wrote thereafter, helped remedy the emphasis within Feminist Studies on white women and within Black studies on Black men".

Context

The interest in black feminism was on the rise in the 1970s, through the writings of Mary Helen Washington, Audre Lorde, Alice Walker, and others.

In 1981, the anthology This Bridge Called My Back, edited by Cherríe Moraga and Gloria E. Anzaldúa, was published and But Some of Us Are Brave was published the following year. In both anthologies, the emphasis was placed on the intersection between race and gender. The contributors argued that previous waves of feminism had focused on issues related to white women. They wanted to negotiate a large space for women of color. According to Teresa de Lauretis, This Bridge Called My Back and But Some Women Are Brave revealed "the feelings, the analyses, and the political positions of feminists of color, and their critiques of white or mainstream feminism" and created a "shift in feminist consciousness."

Impact
In the 2000 reprint of their anthology, editors Hull, Bell-Scott, and Smith described how in 1992 black feminists mobilized "a remarkable national response" - African American Women in Defense of Ourselves - to the controversy surrounding the nomination of Clarence Thomas to the Supreme Court of the United States against the backdrop of allegations by law professor Anita Hill, about sexual harassment that became part of Thomas' confirmation hearings.

Legal scholar Kimberlé Crenshaw cited But Some of Us Are Brave, at the beginning of her seminal 1989 paper, "Demarginalizing the Intersection of Race and Sex: A Black Feminist Critique of Antidiscrimination Doctrine, Feminist Theory and Antiracist Politics" in which she introduced the concept of Intersectionality. Crenshaw is known for introducing and developing intersectional theory to feminism. Crenshaw noted that it was one of the "very few Black women's studies books". She used the title All the Women Are White, All the Blacks Are Men, But Some of Us are Brave, as her "point of departure" to "develop a Black feminist criticism".

Barbara Y. Welke published her article entitled "When All the Women Were White, and All the Blacks Were Men: Gender, Class, Race, and the Road to Plessy, 1855–1914", in reference to Hull et al., in 1995 in the Law and History Review. Welke wrote how Crenshaw, referring to But Some of Us Are Brave, said that the title "sets forth a problematic consequence of the tendency to treat race and gender as mutually exclusive categories of experience and analysis.

Related readings
 This Bridge Called My Back, edited by Cherríe Moraga and Gloria E. Anzaldúa

Contributors (writers)

May Berry
Lorraine Bethel
Martha H. Brown
Constance M. Carroll
Combahee River Collective
Tia Cross
Rita B. Dandridge
Jacquelyn Grant's paper "Black women and the church" was published in the anthology.
Elizabeth Higginbotham
Freada Klein
Jeanne-Marie A. Miller
Ramona Matthewson
Ellen Pence
Michele Russell
Joan R. Sherman
Barbara Smith
Beverly Smith
Erlene Stetson
Alice Walker
Michele Wallace was one of the founding members of the National Black Feminist Organization (NBFO) established in 1973, to respond to the unique issues faced by African-American women. Her 1975 article "A Black Feminist's Search For Sisterhood" (1975) was included in But Some of Us Are Brave.
Mary Helen Washington
Ora Williams
Thelma Williams
 Dora Wilson
Jean Fagan Yellin

See also
Chicana feminism
Black feminism
Womanism
Third-world feminism
Home Girls: A Black Feminist Anthology
Daughters of Africa

References

1982 books
Black feminist books
African-American feminism
American anthologies
Literature by African-American women
Multicultural feminism
Feminist theory
Books about race and ethnicity
The Feminist Press Books